This list of Boise State University people includes notable graduates, non-graduate former students, and administrators affiliated with Boise State University, a public research university in Boise, Idaho. As of 2015, the university has approximately 22,000 current students and over 80,000 living alumni.

Bachelor's degrees were first awarded in the late 1960s; degrees granted prior are associates only.

Business and finance

Government and public policy

Arts, media, and entertainment

Academia and the sciences

Sports

References